Favourite Mistake is the debut studio album by Canadian country music duo Autumn Hill. It was preceded by three singles, including lead single "Anything At All", which peaked at 79 on the Canadian Hot 100, and "Fire", which peaked at 73. The album was released September 10, 2013 through Wax Records.

Reception
In CBC Music's biography of Autumn Hill, the network praised the "compelling stories of loss and love" told through the songs on the album, as well as the duo's "surprising depths" as artists. "Some songs sink in right away," the article reads, "while others sink in over time and won't let you go. Autumn Hill's music does both."

Track listing

Chart performance

Singles

References

2013 debut albums
Autumn Hill albums